The Mataura by-election, 1898 was a by-election held on 26 May 1898 during the 13th New Zealand Parliament in the rural lower South Island electorate of .

Background
The by-election was triggered after sitting Member George Richardson was declared bankrupt. Robert McNab stated that had Richardson contested the election, he would not have accepted a nomination and allowed him to return unopposed. McNab had previously represented the Mataura electorate from 1893 to 1896 when he was defeated by Richardson.

Results
The following table gives the election results:

After winning the contest, McNab held the seat uninterrupted until 1908 when he was defeated.

Notes

Mataura 1898
1897 elections in New Zealand
Mataura
Politics of Southland, New Zealand